Les Misérables: The Staged Concert is a 2019 British live stage recording of the 1980 musical Les Misérables, itself an adaptation of Victor Hugo's 1862 novel, filmed at the Gielgud Theatre in London's West End on 2 December 2019, and broadcast live to UK and Irish cinemas. Starring Michael Ball, Alfie Boe, Carrie Hope Fletcher and Matt Lucas, it was the final performance of the stage production Les Misérables: The All-Star Staged Concert, which ran for four months from 10 August. The album was nominated for the Grammy Award for Best Musical Theater Album at the 64th Annual Grammy Awards.

Background

It was announced in January 2019 that the original production of Les Misérables would close in July 2019 and move to the adjacent Gielgud Theatre for four months to allow for the Queen's Theatre (as it was then called) to be refurbished and reopen in December 2019 with a new updated production. The move would allow the show to continue its record breaking run. The following month, it was announced that the Gielgud production would take the form of an all star-staged concert and run for 16 weeks between 10 August and 30 November.

The Staged Concert

Due to the success of the production, producer Cameron Mackintosh announced that an extra performance had been added on 2 December 2019 which would be broadcast live to cinemas across the UK, Republic of Ireland and the United States. A subsequent change meant that the concert was not broadcast live in North America, with the date pushed back to 8 December.

The stage concert was due to return to the Sondheim Theatre for a limited run from 5 December 2020, this was extended and due to play until 28 February 2021. However the show closed as a result of the COVID-19 pandemic on 15 December after just 10 performances. It returned for a limited run between 20 May and 5 September 2021 with a renewed cast. The new cast featured Jon Robyns as Valjean, Bradley Jaden as Javert, Lucie Jones as Fantine, Gerard Carey and Josefina Gabrielle as the Thénardiers, Shan Ako as Éponine, Harry Apps as Marius, Jamie Muscato as Enjolras, Charlie Burn as Cosette, Earl Carpenter as the Bishop of Digne and understudy Javert, Cameron Blakely as Bamatabois/Babet, Nic Greenshields as Factory Foreman/Brujon, Connor Jones as Grantaire,  and at certain performances Dean Chisnall playing the role of Valjean.

Cast

The all-star cast featured Alfie Boe as Jean Valjean, Michael Ball as Javert, Carrie Hope Fletcher as Fantine and Matt Lucas and Katy Secombe as the Thénardiers. Additionally, Earl Carpenter played the dual role of The Bishop of Digne and Bamatabois whilst understudying Javert and John Owen-Jones played Jean Valjean for three performances a week.  The orchestra was conducted by Alfonso Casado Trigo. The full cast (which also appears in the live stage recording) is listed below:
Michael Ball as Javert
Alfie Boe as Jean Valjean
John Owen-Jones as Jean Valjean at selected performances
Carrie Hope Fletcher as Fantine
Matt Lucas as Monsieur Thénardier
Rob Houchen as Marius
Bradley Jaden as Enjolras
Katy Secombe as Madame Thénardier
Shan Ako as Éponine
Lily Kerhoas as Cosette
Ellie Shenker as Little Cosette
Logan Clark as Gavroche
Earl Carpenter as The Bishop of Digne/Bamatabois
Raymond Walsh as Grantaire
 Craig Mather as Combeferre
 Vinny Coyle as Feuilly
 Niall Sheehy as Courfeyrac
 Ciaran Joyce as Joly
 James Nicholson as Jean Prouvaire
 Andrew York as Lesgles
 Gavin James as Factory Foreman
 Celia Graham as Factory Girl
 Leo Roberts as Brujon
 Stephen Matthews as Babet
 Oliver Jackson as Claquesous
 Adam Bayjou as Montparnasse
 Tamsin Dowsett as Locket Crone
 Grainne Renihan as Hair Crone
 Samantha Dorsey, Holly-Anne Hull, Rosa O'Reilly and Sophie Reeves as Lovely Ladies
 Rosanna Bates, Nicola Espallardo and Gemma Wardle as Factory Workers

Encore

At the end of the final performance, Michael Ball announced that Bradley Jaden would be taking over the role of Javert in the new production. They then sang "Stars" together, as a duet. Next, Alfie Boe, who had performed in the concert, was joined by four other Jean Valjeans to sing "Bring Him Home": John Owen-Jones who shared the role with Boe, Jon Robyns from the new London cast, Dean Chisnall from the 2019 tour, and Killian Donnelly who was in the 2010 concert as well as the 2012 film. After speeches from Cameron Mackintosh and Claude-Michel Schönberg, the performance concluded with the ensemble performing "One Day More".

Home media

The Staged Concert was released digitally on 20 April 2020 in the UK and Australia, with a twice-delayed DVD and Blu-ray following on 2 November 2020 in the UK, having originally been scheduled for release on 6 April and then 20 April.

The film was released digitally in North America on 4 August 2020.

See also
 Les Misérables (musical)
 Les Misérables: The Dream Cast in Concert (1995)
 Les Misérables in Concert: The 25th Anniversary (2010)
 Adaptations of Les Misérables

References

External links
 

Concert films
Films based on adaptations
Films based on Les Misérables
Films based on multiple works
Filmed stage productions
2010s English-language films
Films directed by Nick Morris